Raja Muhkam Singh was a Jat Chieftain and son of Churaman.  He succeeded his father to the leadership of Jats from c. September, 1721 to 18 November 1722.  Fransoo, while giving the genealogy of the Jat rulers, mentions him as the first Raja, who set up his Raj at Thun. It appears, however, that he himself adopted the title of the Raja.

Life 
Muhkam was a capable leader, he had proved his martial ability by defeating and killing the deputy subedar of Agra and by defeating Sadat Khan, the viceroy of Agra. Muhkam had also challenged Mughal authority by helping rebels like Ajit Singh of Mewar and Chattrasal. The Mughal emperor had no choice but to send Jai singh II of Amber against the Jats. Jai Singh prepared an army of 14,000 men and marched towards the Jat strongholds. Muhkam was forced to retreat to the fort of Thun, he attacked Jai Singh's army at night several times leading to heavy losses on both sides. However day by day the heavy artillery of the besiegers was felt by the garrison. Muhkam knew that the fort would fall within a short time so he carried as much treasure as he could and destroyed the rest with gunpowder. On 7-8th November 1722 Muhkam fled to Jodhpur where he paid the Jodhpur Maharaja three lakh rupees to help him against Jai Singh. A Jodhpur army was sent under Bijairaj Bhandari to save Thun, however by the time the Jodhpur army reached Jobner, it was too late as most of the Jat strongholds had fallen and many smaller forts had been dismantled. Muhkam had no choice but to go into exile, a Mughal army was sent to chase him, however he was saved by the Maharaja of Jodhpur. Badan Singh was thus made the Thakur of Bharatpur by Jai Singh.

References

Rulers of Bharatpur state
History of Bharatpur, Rajasthan
18th-century Indian people